The Mallorca Championships is a professional tennis tournament on the ATP Tour. Classified as an ATP 250 tournament, the event is annually held at the outdoor grass courts of Mallorca Country Club in Santa Ponsa, Mallorca, Spain in June, a week prior to Wimbledon Championships.

The event was initially founded as a tournament on the WTA Tour. In June 2014, the Women's Tennis Association (WTA) announced that a new grass court tennis tournament would be organized in Mallorca, beginning in 2016, as the WTA Tour would expand the grass court swing between the French Open and Wimbledon from two weeks to three. The new tennis complex would have five natural grass courts, with construction and maintenance contributions from the All England Lawn Tennis and Croquet Club (AELTC). Classified as a WTA International event, the women's tournament lasted for three years on the calendar and ended after the last edition in June 2019, with the event's sanction and International classification transferred to the Birmingham Classic for the following year.

In September 2019, the AELTC announced that they would invest in several new grass tennis tournaments for the ATP Tour and WTA Tour. Among the new investments included a new men's event in Mallorca for a debut in 2020, marking a return of the ATP to Mallorca after 18 years, and be organized on the existing tennis complex. The new event would be headed by Toni Nadal and be held during the grass swing's third and final week. After the COVID-19 pandemic forced the postponement of the relaunched ATP tournament, it held its inaugural edition in 2021.

Past results

Men's singles

Women's singles

Men's doubles

Women's doubles

See also 
List of tennis tournaments

References 

 
WTA Tour
Grass court tennis tournaments
Tennis tournaments in Spain
Recurring sporting events established in 2016
2016 establishments in the Balearic Islands
Defunct tennis tournaments in Spain